Lene Gammelgaard (born 18 December 1961) is a Danish mountaineer, author and motivational speaker. Gammelgaard is the 35th woman and the first Scandinavian woman to climb Mount Everest, reaching the peak via the South East Ridge route on 10 May 1996 as part of Scott Fischer's Sagarmatha Environmental Expedition.

Her book Climbing High, published by HarperCollins in 1998, recounts the 1996 Everest disaster when a storm took the lives of Scott Fischer, Rob Hall, and six other climbers. The book has sold over 1 million copies worldwide and been translated into 13 languages. 

Gammelgaard was portrayed in the film Everest (2015) by actress Charlotte Bøving.

Early Life and Career 
Gammelgaard was born in Copenhagen, Denmark, to Kirsten and Helge Nielsen.

In 1982, she attended the University of Copenhagen where she got a law degree specializing in tax and company law. She worked full-time as a finance analyst at Erik Møller's Efterfølgere during her time in university. Later that year, she also worked as a purchasing manager in charge of negotiations for legal and transport issues pertaining to the Pinetta Textile Company. 

In 1991 she pursued supplementary study at the Danish school of journalism. In 1993, she studied psychotherapy specializing in addictions, installing life altering self-responsibility habits, and the American 12-step method. She co-founded two drug-treatment centres and developed a therapy program for professionals and co-dependants, aimed at changing individuals’ mental attitudes and behaviours towards self-responsibility in a one-week process. 

During this time, Gammelgaard gained sailing experience as a deck hand sailing in the Caribbean, and crossed the Atlantic via the Azores. She spent three months on a mountaineering expedition around Dhaulagiri Massif, and made an individual attempt on climbing Island Peak in Nepal. During this attempt she met Scott Fischer, who would become her friend and mentor.

Expeditions 
In 1995 she embarked on an expedition with Scott Fischer and Mountain Madness to the Karakorum mountain range, Broad Peak base camp and Gondogoro Pass in Pakistan. It was during this expedition on the glacier below K2 that Fischer invited her to climb Mt. Everest in the spring of 1996 with him. Year 1996 saw her reach the summit of Everest and safely return on an expedition which claimed many lives, including Fischer who died on the way back from the summit. This expedition received a lot of media attention and multiple films and documentaries were based on it. The experience opened many doors for her career.

In 1997 she went on a reconnaissance to Peru, Chile and Argentina to participate in a horse expedition and helped take a young Greenlandic woman from a human resource development program. As an expedition leader on a trip to Kilimanjaro, she instructed eight African youths from the slums of Arusha and taught them to become helpers on trips for African Environment, African Adventure Agent and National Outdoor Leadership School (NOLS). She then went on another reconnaissance and participated in a documentary film from Greenland. In 1998 as an expedition leader she led 12 Danes to Mount Kilimanjaro. It was in this year that she published her bestselling book Climbing High and went on promotional tours. She participated in a sea kayaking expedition course in Alaska with NOLS and fishing expeditions in Greenland. She also participated in a reconnaissance in Sweden for Human resource developmental programme. In 1999 her book ‘Håbets Sejr’ – The Victory of Hope was published in Denmark. The Victory of Hope is a strategic self-programming process aimed to instill the will to survive and overcome any setback.

She was an expedition leader and organizer of Upper Mustang, Nepal trek. She went on a sailing trip to the Goeteborg Skargaard and British Virgin Islands. In April 2005 she went on a trekking trip to the Atlas Mountains, Morocco and a horse trek in Utah and Arizona with Equestrian Tours. In 2006 she was the captain of her off-shore sailing yacht Van de Stadt 34 from Amsterdam to Copenhagen through the North Sea. She lived for 14 months in Nepal when her mission to adopt her daughter was disrupted by the peace process and UNICEF. She shared her experiences of being victimized by the international adoption and humanitarian process in her book Mitlivskamp "The struggle of my life”. She says "Everest and 'fighting for my daughter' has taught me the importance of determination and never giving up. Quitting is not in my vocabulary."

In 2008, she broadcast Storm over Everest, a documentary by US film maker David Breashears, with the mountaineers who were caught in the death zone on Everest in May 1996. Later that year Gammelgaard was awarded the Mt. Everest Golden Jubilee Medal by Nepal's Government. In 2009 she received a Nepal Tourism Board award for her focus on expanding tourism in Nepal and was later nominated as the Honorary Goodwill Ambassador by the board. Twenty years after 10th of May 1996, Gammelgaard published To the Summit and Safe Return in which she gave her extensive account and reflections on Everest 1996. She gives an account of her experience sharing life mountaineers such as Anatoli Boukreev and Scott Fischer and the way they impacted her and she approaches existences.

She currently operates her own consulting business, Human Innovation. She also works as a professional lecturer and author. Gammelgaard is often published in leading Danish and German newspapers and magazines. She works to raise funds for the Lapka Sherpa Educational Fund, which pays for education for orphaned daughters of Sherpa mountaineers in Nepal.

Climbing High 
Climbing High is an account of Gammelgaard's experiences and memories while climbing Mount Everest. On this expedition, she became the 35th woman and first Scandinavian woman to reach the peak of Mount Everest. She writes about how she was inspired to take on this adventure by Scott Fischer, and how she mentally prepared for the climb as part of the Sargarmantha Environmental Expedition. She writes of how she planned to climb without supplementary oxygen partly as a kick start to open the European market to Mountain Madness, Scott Fischer's mountain guiding operation, with her as the company's representative.

Personal life 
Gammelgaard has participated in horsemanship training, sailing quests and a skiing trip both alone and with her children. Gammelgaard was married to Soren Smidt, a fellow mountaineer, until 1992 when they divorced.

Other Involvements 
Gammelgaard was a project leader and activist at Greenpeace.

See also
List of 20th-century summiters of Mount Everest
List of Mount Everest records

References

External links 

 
 I survived the most deadly day on Mount Everest says climber who lived through 8 death tragedy By Boudicca Fox-Leonard (18 Jan 2016)

People from Copenhagen
Summiters of Mount Everest
Living people
20th-century Danish non-fiction writers
21st-century Danish non-fiction writers
Danish mountain climbers
1961 births